Kubango is a town in southeastern Angola.

Transport 

It is served by a station on the southern line of the national railway network.

See also 

 Railway stations in Angola

References 

Populated places in Angola